M/V Pallas, callsign C6LO9, IMO number 7039206, was a 147 m cargo ship built in 1971. On 25 October 1998 its cargo of lumber caught fire while traveling the North Sea off the west coast of Jutland. The ship ran aground on October 29 off the German island of Amrum, in the Schleswig-Holstein Wadden Sea National Park. 200-300 tons of fuel oil were lost overboard and caused Germany's most notable maritime environmental disaster.

Parts of the wreck still lie off the island of Amrum and are visible at low tide.

Fire and sinking 
At the time of the sinking, the ship was owned by the Italian company Bogazzi Servizi Naval and running under the flag of Bahamas.

On October 20, 1998 the "Pallas" started in the Swedish port of Hudiksvall north of Stockholm. It is to bring 2,500 tons of sawn timber from Sweden to Morocco. The captain first tried to smother the fire. He doesn't succeed. The situation spiraled out of control just before midnight. At 11:54 p.m., the ship broadcasts "Mayday". A Danish and a German rescue helicopter make their way to the blazing freighter.

The fire could not be contained and the crew was evacuated; one crew member died in the process. 

Several attempts to get the ship under tow were unsuccessful, and it ran aground on October 29 off the German island of Amrum, in the Schleswig-Holstein Wadden Sea National Park.

The smoldering fire in the cargo could only be fully extinguished a month after it broke out. Parts of the wreck of the Pallas still lie off Amrum and are visible at low tide.

Environmental disaster 
200-300 tons of fuel oil were lost overboard, killing approximately 16.000 sea birds, predominantly common eiders. Only parts of the wreck could be salvaged to date, and the hull is still visible off Amrum.

Political consequences

The case led to political discontent over a lack of coordinated emergency tow capabilities on the German coast, and contributed to the establishment of the Central Command for Maritime Emergencies (German: Havariekommando).

The Minister for Environment of Schleswig-Holstein Rainder Steenblock (Alliance 90/The Greens) was criticized many times for his refusal to take responsibility. Steenblock only traveled to the disaster site under pressure from Prime Minister Heide Simonis (SPD). Not only the Greens-friendly environmental protection associations NABU and BUND suggested that he resignin the month after the incident, also the MP Adelheid Winking-Nikolay from his own parliamentary group, Der Spiegel wrote in 1999.

Links 
 Lars Clausen: Schwachstellenanalyse aus Anlass der Havarie der PALLAS. Bundesverwaltungsamt – Zentralstelle für Zivilschutz, Bonn 2003, 
 Abschlussbericht des Untersuchungsausschusses Pallas des Landtags Schleswig-Holstein auf Landtags-Drucksache 14/2650 vom 18. Januar 2000 (pdf; 28,8 MB)

References

Shipwrecks in the North Sea
Environmental disasters in Europe